Kuchurovsky is a rural locality (a khutor) in Kumylzhenskoye Rural Settlement, Kumylzhensky District, Volgograd Oblast, Russia. The population was 87 as of 2010. There are 3 streets.

Geography 
Kuchurovsky is located in forest steppe, on Khopyorsko-Buzulukskaya Plain, on the bank of the Stary Khopyor River, 21 km northwest of Kumylzhenskaya (the district's administrative centre) by road. Krasnoarmeysky is the nearest rural locality.

References 

Rural localities in Kumylzhensky District